Senthamizh Paattu is a 1992 Indian Tamil-language film, written and directed by P. Vasu. The film stars Prabhu and Sukanya while Salim Ghouse plays a supporting role. It was released on 25 October 1992 on the eve of Diwali. The film was remade in Telugu as Amma Koduku, and in Kannada as Rasika in 1994.

Plot

Cast 

Prabhu as Balasubramaniyan/Bala
Sukanya as Durgadevi/Durga
Kasthuri as Shanmathi
Sujatha as Kalaivani
Ravikumar as Ravi
Vijayakumar as Rangasamy
Manjula as Meenakshi
Salim Ghouse as Rajarathnam
Kavitha as Rajeswari
Kazan Khan as Boopathy
Goundamani as Murugesan
V. Gopalakrishnan as Ravi Father
LIC Narasimhan as College Professor
Ponnambalam as Fighter
Sakthi as Young Bala
Mayilsamy as Konavayen

Production 
The success of P. Vasu's family drama En Thangachi Padichava (1988) starring Prabhu prompted further collaborations in the same genre between the pair with Chinna Thambi (1991) and Senthamizh Paattu (1992) being released soon after.

Soundtrack 
The music was composed by M. S. Viswanathan and Ilaiyaraaja, with lyrics by Vaali. The song "Solli Solli" gave a break to its singer Sunanda.

Release and reception 
Senthamizh Paattu was released on 25 October 1992, Diwali day. Malini Mannath of The Indian Express called it "rather a crude imitation" of Chinna Thambi. Supraja Sridharan of Kalki wrote that if one could tolerate vulgar comedy, they could enjoy the film for the naïve Sukanya, playful Kasthuri, natural Prabhu and beautiful music.

References

External links 

1990s Tamil-language films
1992 films
Films directed by P. Vasu
Films scored by Ilaiyaraaja
Films scored by M. S. Viswanathan
Indian drama films
Tamil films remade in other languages